In the 2007–08 season, the Azerbaijan First Division—the second tier of professional football in Azerbaijan—was organised in two groups, A and B, each with 10 teams. The top three teams in each group entered a playoff competition. The winning team was Bakılı PFK of Baku.

Group A

Stadia and locations
Note: Table lists in alphabetical order.

League table

Group B

Stadia and locations
Note: Table lists in alphabetical order.

League table

Final stage

Gold points

Final game

Final table

References

Azerbaijan First Division seasons
2007–08 in Azerbaijani football
Azer